Songs 95 is the third studio album by American singer and songwriter Donna de Lory, released in 2002 by Secret Road Music Services. It contains ten songs by De Lory written throughout 1995. Several of the album's songs would later be reworked and appear on her succeeding albums. "Where I've Never Been" originally appeared on her second studio album Bliss (2000) and was distributed as a promotional CD single in the United States in 2001.

Track listing

References 

2002 albums
Donna De Lory albums